Gaspar Di Pizio (born 23 February 2000) is an Argentine professional footballer who plays as a centre-forward for Estudiantes.

Career
Di Pizio started out at Escuela de El Potrero, before signing with Estudiantes at the end of 2012. Eight years later, in 2020, he was promoted into their first-team under caretaker manager Leandro Desábato. Di Pizio made his senior debut on 22 November 2020 in a Copa de la Liga Profesional home defeat to Aldosivi, as he replaced Darío Sarmiento with twenty-six minutes remaining.

Career statistics
.

Notes

References

External links

2000 births
Living people
Footballers from La Plata
Argentine footballers
Argentine expatriate footballers
Association football forwards
Argentine Primera División players
Primera B de Chile players
Estudiantes de La Plata footballers
A.C. Barnechea footballers
Expatriate footballers in Chile